The 2019 World Taekwondo Championships was the 24th edition of the World Taekwondo Championships and was held at the Manchester Arena, in Manchester, Great Britain from 15 to 19 May 2019. This was the first time the UK has held the event.

Medal table

Medal summary

Men

Women

Team ranking

Men

Women

References

Results book

 
World Taekwondo Championships
World Championships
International taekwondo competitions hosted by England
World Taekwondo Championships
Sports competitions in Manchester
Taekwondo in England
World Taekwondo Championships